Lindhurst Wind Farm is a power-producing wind farm in Lindhurst parish near Mansfield, England. Built for Npower Renewables, it produces electricity from five wind turbines. It has a total nameplate capacity of 9 MW of electricity, providing enough power to serve the average needs of 5,400 homes.

History
Lindhurst Wind Farm was approved by the local planning committee at Newark and Sherwood District Council in September 2007. Local councillors voted 8–3 in favour of the application, which had been recommended for approval by the council's planning officer and supported by 3,300 local residents petition of support.

Preparatory work for the site began in 2008, with the wind turbines being erected in August 2010. The turbines went live on 10 September 2010.

See also

 Energy in the United Kingdom

References

Wind farms in England
Buildings and structures in Mansfield